The Manitoba Museum, previously the Manitoba Museum of Man and Nature, is a human and natural history museum in Winnipeg, Manitoba, as well as the province's largest, not-for-profit centre for heritage and science education.

Located close to City Hall, the museum was designed in 1965 by Herbert Henry Gatenby Moody of Moody and Moore. Including its Planetarium and Science Gallery exhibit, the museum focuses on collecting, researching, and sharing Manitoba's human and natural heritage, culture, and environment.

The Hudson's Bay Company donated its historic three-centuries-old collection (and supporting funds) to the museum in 1994, becoming the largest corporate donation ever received by the museum. The Institute for Stained Glass in Canada has documented the stained glass at the museum.

History

Background
In 1879, the Historical and Scientific Society of Manitoba officially began to collect and preserve its heritage at some unknown location. In the early 1890s, E. Thompson Seton wrote about the Manitoba Museum, which was reportedly housed in the basement of Winnipeg's City Hall. Though, as of 1900, there was no public museum in Winnipeg, there were significant private collectors: from 1911 to the early 1920s, material from their collections was exhibited in the Exposition Building of the former Winnipeg Industrial Bureau at Main Street and Water. The present museum holds some of these collections although most were dispersed.

In 1932, the Natural History Society of Manitoba, the Winnipeg Board of Trade, and the Auditorium Commission founded the Manitoba Museum Association. Soon thereafter, the Manitoba Museum officially opened its doors on 15 December 1932 in the newly built Winnipeg Civic Auditorium (now the Archives of Manitoba Building) on Memorial Boulevard alongside the Winnipeg Art Gallery (WAG). The museum remained in that location with the WAG until 1967.

Critical support for outreach programs and exhibits came from the Carnegie Corporation and Junior League. Professors at the University of Manitoba, formerly the Manitoba Agriculture College, played significant roles in the museum's development. The museum was run by volunteer honorary curators, with assistance from other dedicated volunteers and a small staff.

As the museum grew in acquisitions and attendance, the need for an expanded facility became critical. So, in 1954, the Board began planning a new institution, which would reflect the values of the time, consulting extensively with the American Museum of Natural History and the Hayden Planetarium. Funding came in large part from federal project sources designed to create new Canadian cultural facilities for the 1967 Canadian Centennial commemoration.

Establishment
In 1964, a proposal for a museum and planetarium was submitted to the Manitoba government headed by Premier Duff Roblin.  The proposal stated that:Manitoba needs a Modern Museum of Man and Nature. Not a collection of stuffed birds, antiquated firearms or dusty rocks – but a living history of man and his environment, tracing the evolution of Manitoba's resources, industry and culture, past and present, and pointing the way, through research, to the future. To inform, instruct and educate by interpreting nature to man and their effect on each other in the function of a Modern Museum of Man and Nature.In 1965, provincial legislation dissolved the unincorporated Manitoba Museum Association and incorporated two new organizations—the Manitoba Museum of Man and Nature and the Manitoba Planetarium—which were included in the plans to build a new Centennial Centre. With H. David Hemphill as its managing director (1970–88), paid curatorial positions were created and the former volunteer curators were appointed to the Museum Advisory Council. Most of the invaluable collections were transferred to the new corporation; during 1968–69, while the new building was being completed, the collections were put in storage. The ultimate cost of the original construction of the museum would total CA$3,548,700.

Lieutenant Governor Richard Bowles opened the planetarium on 15 May 1968, and the new museum facilities—the Orientation and Grasslands galleries—were officially opened on 15 July 1970 by Her Majesty, Queen Elizabeth II to commemorate the province's centennial celebration. The collection of the previous Manitoba Museum would provide the basis for this museum.

In July 1972, the museum and planetarium would be integrated as a singular entity: the Manitoba Museum of Man and Nature. In December 1996, the Manitoba Museum Foundation, Inc. was created as an independent foundation, as well as an expanded organization, The Manitoba Museum, which now included a science gallery. Over time, prior to the 2000s, the original two galleries would be joined by exhibits devoted to earth history and sea-trading (1973), urban life (1974), the Canadian arctic and subarctic (1976), and the Boreal forest (1980).

The museum formally returned to the name, The Manitoba Museum, in 2002.

Modern updates and expansions 
In 1994, the Hudson's Bay Company (HBC) designated the museum as the permanent home for its historic material collection. In order to house this collection, construction went underway for a new wing on the museum's east side in 1996. The wing would officially open in September 1998, followed by the Hudson's Bay Archives itself on 2 May 2000.

In 1995, Smith Carter Architects and Engineers Inc. designed the museum's Alloway Hall addition, creating larger space for travelling exhibits, consuming much of the museum's courtyard and Main Street entranceway. Costing CA$5.3 million, this project was completely funded by the federal and provincial governments, as well as The Winnipeg Foundation. The space features state-of-the-art lighting technology and 13-foot-high windows with views of Steinkopf Gardens and the Manitoba Centennial Centre.

When the Parklands / Mixed-Woods Gallery opened in September 2003, the grand design for a museum to portray the human and natural history of all of Manitoba was complete. A renewed Science Gallery opened in 2008 replacing the 'Touch the Universe' Gallery. The plan called for a separate Science Museum building next to the Manitoba Museum.  In 2018, the Nonsuch Gallery was updated and enhanced as part of the 'Bringing Our Stories Forward' gallery renewal project. The reopening of the Nonsuch Gallery would coincide with the 350th anniversary of the voyage of the Nonsuch to Hudson Bay in 1668.

On 1 November 2019, the museum opened its Winnipeg Gallery, the first new permanent exhibition space of the museum since 2003. Also in 2019, the Manitoba Museum was in the process of upgrading its antiquated HVAC system.

Since 2020, as result of COVID-19 regulations in Manitoba, the Manitoba Museum has been offering virtual tours and programming, such as the weekly 'DOME@HOME' program with Planetarium Astronomer Scott Young, which takes place on Thursday evenings at 7 pm.

On 8 April 2021, the museum opened its Prairies Gallery, marking the completion of the $20.5 million 'Bringing Our Stories Forward' Capital Renewal Project, which in addition to the renewal of the Nonsuch Gallery, and creation of the new Winnipeg Gallery, also saw the renewal of the Boreal Forest Corridor, and Welcome Gallery.

Collections and museum galleries
With more than 2.9 million artifacts and specimens, the Manitoba Museum houses collections that reflect the human and natural history of Manitoba, shared with visitors through nine interpretive galleries.

Together, these galleries explore the history and environment of the province, from its northern Arctic coast to its southern prairie grasslands. These galleries include:

 Welcome Gallery (renewed 2021)
 Earth History Gallery (1973)
 Arctic/Sub-Arctic Gallery (1976)
 Boreal Forest Gallery (1980, Boreal Forest Corridor renewed 2018)
 Nonsuch Gallery (renewed 2018)
 HBC Gallery (2000)
 Parklands / Mixed-Woods Gallery (2003)
 Prairies Gallery (2021)
 Winnipeg Gallery (2019)

The renewed Welcome Gallery still contains the original diorama featuring a Métis hunter on horseback closing in on a herd of bison. A new exhibit in the Gallery, created in cooperation with the Treaty Relations Commission of Manitoba, features the medals, pipes and pipe bags associated with these agreements. It demonstrates the fact that the museum is committed to working with Indigenous peoples to accurately tell the history of Manitoba.

The Earth History Gallery displays Manitoba's geological history through the fossils of the Ordovician Sea, which covered the province a half-billion years ago. Geological change is recognized by fossil signposts such as the giant trilobite, plesiosaur, and the mosasaur, who inhabited the area of what is now Manitoba nearly 80 million years ago. In the Ancient Seas exhibit, a virtual underwater observatory shows the Hudson Bay region during the Ordovician period. The Manitoba Museum is the first Canadian museum to recreate marine life as it was 450 million years ago.

The Nonsuch Gallery houses the museum's showcase piece: a full-size replica of the Nonsuch, the ship whose voyage in 1668 led to the founding of the Hudson's Bay Company (HBC). The rest of the Nonsuch Gallery imitates a scene set a wharf in 1669 Deptford, England, where the ship has 'docked'. The Nonsuch replica was built in England in 1968 to celebrate the 300th anniversary of the HBC, and sailed  of water before reaching the Manitoba Museum in 1974. Moreover, the gallery walls were built around the replica, hence why it cannot be removed from the museum without dismantling it. Built using hand tools of the 17th century. it is considered one of the finest replicas in the world.

The Winnipeg Gallery opened on 1 November 2019 dedicated to the story of Winnipeg's development over the past century, integrating Indigenous history with Manitoba's 150 years of immigration. It features a stained-glass logo of Winnipeg, which used to be located at the old "gingerbread" City Hall and has not been seen since the 1960s. The gallery also features a timeline film, framed by the former Eaton's Place entrance, that presents the chronological history of Winnipeg. Themes in this gallery include Winnipeg as an "Indigenous Homeland," as a "City of Newcomers," or as a "City of Celebrations," in a seven-meter long case full of artifacts. The Winnipeg Gallery also includes a Personalities Wall, showcasing 30 individuals who are part of the city's history. The much loved Urban Gallery exhibit, now called Winnipeg 1920, is part of the new Winnipeg Gallery, and recreates a Winnipeg street scene in the 1920s.

The Prairies Gallery, which opened on 8 April 2021, seeks to show the history of the Manitoba prairies through geological time. It looks at the human connections to the land, as well as the plants, animals, and fungi that can be found there. This gallery was created with the guidance of the Museum Indigenous Advisory Circle, and the Museum Community Engagement Team of Newcomers to Manitoba.

HBC Collection 
By the 20th century, the Hudson's Bay Company (HBC) made a point to collect "natural history specimens, human history artifacts and visual material relating the company's activities in North America." While the company itself acquired materials for exhibition at its London headquarters, many of its North American employees also accumulated their own private collections.

On 2 May 1920, in celebration of the 250th anniversary of the granting of its Charter, the HBC contracted Francis David Wilson, a former District manager for James Bay "to collect historical relics, lore, and souvenirs of the early history of the Company" for a museum. One-half of the collection originated in First Nations, Métis, and Inuit communities, acquired by the HBC through purchase, trade, ceremonial gift exchange, and donations from fur traders and their families. In addition to preserving a record of the HBC's contribution to the development of British North America for posterity, the collections and their exhibition were considered to be the company's legacy to all Canadians; a “gift to the nation."

In June 1922, the HBC installed a major exhibition of material at its Main Street store in Winnipeg. By 1926, the museum exhibition was kept in new quarters at the present store on Portage Avenue. The objective of the exhibition was "to depict by means of relics, pictures, documents, models, etcetera, the history of the Hudson's Bay Company, life in the fur trade, the story of pioneer settlers and the customs, dress and industries of the Aboriginal tribes."

The HBC cared for the collections in a professional manner, and the exhibition became one of the first major public museums in Western Canada. The Collection is also one of the world's most significant historic resources.

In 1994, the HBC designated the Manitoba Museum as the permanent home for its historic collection, which portrays more than 300 centuries of HBC's history. Thereafter, the museum mounted two exhibitions of the collection, the first in 1995 and the second in 1997. In 1996, in order to house the collection, construction for a new wing began with a dedication by the Prince of Wales. The building, as well as a research facility and public gallery, was complete in 1998. The Hudson's Bay Gallery would officially be open to the public on 2 May 2000. The artifacts held in the gallery reveal stories that includes the quest for the fabled Northwest Passage and the establishment of the HBC's trading empire.

Planetarium 

The Manitoba Museum Planetarium opened on 15 May 1968. The planetarium's live programming combine pre-recorded visual sequences of the sky and space, with commentary and question-and-answer segments from a show presenter. Full dome shows also run with offerings for family audiences, and are often accompanied by a live show segment before or after the film.

In 2012, the Manitoba Museum became the first planetarium in Canada to offer visitors the Digistar® 5 All-Dome digital projection technology. This technology makes it possible to show the sky as it would look from anywhere on Earth, or even in the galaxy, at any point in history, or in the future. Though no longer in use, the original projector (colloquially known as 'Marvin') remains a beloved feature of the planetarium theatre.

Science Gallery 

The Manitoba Museum Science Gallery provides a place for experiential, hands-on learning. Each exhibit provides a breakdown of the science behind the experience. The Science Gallery received an update and two new permanent exhibits in 2016. The Brickyard: Build with LEGO Bricks Lego tables provide a chance to experiment with engineering, and the Engineered for Speed Race Track exhibit allows visitors to create their own toy race car, and test it against other visitors' cars.

On 22 March 2014, the Lake Winnipeg: Shared Solutions exhibit opened in the Science Gallery. This exhibit features a high-tech computer simulation of the Lake Winnipeg watershed. In the game, visitors serve as stewards of the lake, deciding what problems to solve and how. The $1 million-dollar plus exhibit, received financial and in-kind support through the International Institute of Sustainable Development, Manitoba Hydro, Royal Bank Blue Water Project, Manitoba Pork, Environment Canada's EcoAction Community Funding Program, the Richardson Foundation, the Province of Manitoba, Manitoba Education, Lake Winnipeg Foundation and Canadian Wildlife Federation.

Affiliations
The museum's property is owned by the Manitoba Centennial Centre, who are also in charge of cleaning the museum.

The Manitoba Museum is affiliated with Canadian Museums Association, Canadian Heritage Information Network, the Canadian Association of Science Centres, and Virtual Museum of Canada.

References

External links

 The Manitoba Museum
Manitoba Museum YouTube channel

Museums in Winnipeg
Planetaria in Canada
History museums in Manitoba
Science museums in Canada
Natural history museums in Canada
Modernist architecture in Canada
1965 establishments in Manitoba
Museums established in 1965
Tourist attractions in Winnipeg
Buildings and structures in downtown Winnipeg
Downtown Winnipeg
Science and technology in Manitoba